Castle Rock, Oregon may refer to:

Castle Rock, Morrow County, Oregon, a former post office in Morrow County, Oregon
A fictional community that is the setting for Stand by Me
Castle Rock, Clatsop County, Oregon

See also
Castle Rock (disambiguation)